Vatrushka is an Eastern European pastry (pirog) formed as a ring of dough with Tvorog in the middle, sometimes with the addition of raisins or bits of fruit. The most common size is about 5–10 cm (2–4 in) in diameter, but larger versions also exist. Vatrushkas are typically baked using a sweet yeast bread dough. Savoury varieties are made using unsweetened dough, with onion added to the filling.

The etymology of the word is uncertain. A widespread hypothesis derives the name from the word vatra meaning "fire" in some Slavic languages. Alternative hypotheses trace it back either to the verb teret (тереть, "to rub" or "to grate") or to the term tvorog (творог).

See also

 Karelian pasty
 Khachapuri
 Kolach
 List of Russian dishes
 Pirozhki
 Syrniki
 Vareniki

References

Belarusian desserts
Cheese dishes
Ukrainian pastries
Russian pastries
Soviet cuisine
Yeast breads
Street food in Russia
Street food in Ukraine